This is a list of cities, towns and villages in Vojvodina, a province of Serbia.

List of largest cities and towns in Vojvodina

List of urban settlements in Vojvodina

List of all urban settlements (cities and towns) in Vojvodina with population figures from recent censuses:

South Bačka District:

West Bačka District:

North Bačka District:

North Banat District:

Central Banat District:

South Banat District:

Syrmia District:

The inhabited places of South Bačka District

City of Novi Sad – Novi Sad Municipality

Hamlets and suburbs:
 Bangladeš (Бангладеш)
 Kamenjar (Камењар)
 Lipov Gaj (Липов Гај)
 Nemanovci (Немановци)
 Pejićevi Salaši (Пејићеви Салаши)

City of Novi Sad – Petrovaradin Municipality

Bač Municipality

Hamlets and suburbs:
 Labudnjača (Лабудњача)  
 Mali Bač (Мали Бач) 
 Živa (Жива)

Bačka Palanka Municipality

Bački Petrovac Municipality

Bečej Municipality

Hamlets:
 Drljan (Дрљан)
 Novo Selo (Ново Село)
 Poljanice (Пољанице)

Beočin Municipality

Hamlets:
 Koruška (Корушка)

Srbobran Municipality

Hamlets:
 Doline (Долине)
 Kipovo (Кипово)

Sremski Karlovci Municipality

Temerin Municipality

Titel Municipality

Vrbas Municipality

Žabalj Municipality

The inhabited places of West Bačka District

City of Sombor

Hamlets and suburbs:
 Bilić (Билић) 
 Bukovački Salaši (Буковачки Салаши) 
 Kruševlje (Крушевље) 
 Lugumerci (Лугумерци) 
 Rančevo (Ранчево) 
 Žarkovac (Жарковац)

Apatin Municipality

Hamlets:
 Staro Selo (Старо Село)
 Veliki Salaš (Велики Салаш)

Kula Municipality

Odžaci Municipality

The inhabited places of North Bačka District

City of Subotica

Hamlets:
 Madaraš (Мадараш)

Bačka Topola Municipality

Mali Iđoš Municipality

The inhabited places of North Banat District

Kikinda municipality

Hamlets:
 Bikač (Бикач)
 Vincaid (Винцаид)

Novi Kneževac municipality

Čoka municipality

Ada municipality

Kanjiža Municipality

Senta Municipality

The inhabited places of Central Banat District

City of Zrenjanin

Hamlets:
 Zlatica (Златица)

Novi Bečej Municipality

Nova Crnja Municipality

Žitište Municipality

Sečanj Municipality

The inhabited places of South Banat District

City of Pančevo

Kovin Municipality

Opovo Municipality

Kovačica Municipality

Alibunar Municipality

Hamlets:
 Novi Vladimirovac
 Devojački Bunar

Plandište Municipality

Vršac Municipality

Bela Crkva Municipality

Hamlets:
 Stara Palanka

The inhabited places of Syrmia District

City of Sremska Mitrovica

Hamlets:
 Vranjaš  
 Venac

Šid Municipality

Irig Municipality

Ruma Municipality

Pećinci Municipality

Stara Pazova Municipality

Inđija Municipality

Former settlements
Former settlements in Vojvodina that were abandoned or resettled:

Former settlements in Vojvodina that were merged with other places:

See also

Cities and towns of Serbia
Populated places of Serbia
Municipalities and cities of Serbia
Districts of Serbia
Statistical regions of Serbia
Administrative divisions of Serbia
Former Serbian exonyms in Vojvodina
German exonyms in Vojvodina
Hungarian exonyms in Vojvodina
Slovak exonyms in Vojvodina
Rusyn exonyms in Vojvodina
Romanian exonyms in Vojvodina

References

Further reading
Slobodan Ćurčić, Broj stanovnika Vojvodine, Novi Sad, 1996.
Slobodan Ćurčić, Naselja Srema – geografske karakteristike, Novi Sad, 2000.
Dr Slobodan Ćurčić, Naselja Banata – geografske karakteristike, Novi Sad, 2004.
Dr Slobodan Ćurčić, Naselja Bačke – geografske karakteristike, Novi Sad, 2007.
Jovan Erdeljanović, Srbi u Banatu, Novi Sad, 1992.

External links
Population of settlements in Vojvodina (first results of 2011 census in Serbia)
Population of settlements in Vojvodina (1948–2002)

 
Vojvodina